The lined blind snake (Afrotyphlops lineolatus), also known as the common lined blind snake, common lined worm snake, or lineolate blind snake, is a species of snake in the family Typhlopidae. It is widely distributed in Sub-Saharan Africa, from Senegal in the west to Ethiopia in the east and Angola and Zambia in the south.

References

lineolatus
Snakes of Africa
Reptiles of West Africa
Reptiles of Angola
Reptiles of Cameroon
Reptiles of the Central African Republic
Fauna of Chad
Reptiles of the Democratic Republic of the Congo
Reptiles of Ethiopia
Fauna of the Gambia
Fauna of Ghana
Fauna of Guinea
Fauna of Ivory Coast
Reptiles of Kenya
Fauna of Liberia
Reptiles of Nigeria
Reptiles of the Republic of the Congo
Fauna of Senegal
Fauna of Sierra Leone
Reptiles of South Sudan
Vertebrates of Sudan
Reptiles of Tanzania
Fauna of Togo
Reptiles of Uganda
Reptiles of Zambia
Taxa named by Giorgio Jan
Reptiles described in 1863